Cascade Township may refer to the following places in the United States of America:

Cascade Township, Michigan
Cascade Township, Minnesota
Cascade Township, Lycoming County, Pennsylvania

Township name disambiguation pages